is a 2011 Japanese film directed by Eiji Uchida. It screened at the 2011 New York Asian Film Festival. The film is based on Naoki Yamamoto's manga of the same title.

External links
 
 

2010s Japanese-language films
2011 films
2010s Japanese films